Matías Fernández may refer to:

Matías Fernández (footballer, born 1986) (born 1986), Chilean footballer
Matías Fernández (footballer, born 1995) (born 1995), Chilean footballer
Augusto Fernández, also known as Augusto Matías Fernández, (born 1986), Argentine footballer
Guillermo Fernández (footballer, born 1991), also known as Guillermo Matías Fernández, (born 1991), Argentine footballer